Jingjiang is a county-level city under the administration of Taizhou, Jiangsu province, China. It is located on the northern (left) bank of the Yangtze River, and is the southernmost part of Taizhou City, bordering Nantong to the northeast, Suzhou to the southeast, Wuxi to the south, Changzhou to the southwest, and Zhenjiang to the west. The area of Jingjiang is 655.6 square kilometres and the population was 684,360 at the 2010 census.

History 
The terrain of Jingjiang nowadays was originated as a shoal in the Yangtze River, which was known Matuosha in the ancient China. As the shoal had been extended, it was separated from then Jiangyin county to found a new county in 1471. As being looted by the Wokou for several time, it is designated Jiangjiang (means "pacifying the Yangzte River").

The county under the administration of the prefecture-level city of Yangzhou originally, was converted to a county-level city in 1993, then was transferred to the Taizhou in 1996.

Geography
The Yangzte had split into the north and the south distributaries at Jingjiang, but the city merged into the north bank later than the 1610s inasmuch as the north distributary was filled in by continued deposition.

Climate

Transportation
The city is part of the Yangtze River Delta region and has one river crossing.  The Jiangyin Suspension Bridge, which carries the G2 Beijing–Shanghai Expressway to Jiangyin, is one of the longest suspension bridges in the world.  The G40 Shanghai–Xi'an Expressway to Nanjing and Shanghai also passes through the city.

Economy
Traditionally, the city has been noted for its core manufacturing industries in electronics, auto parts, biochemicals, textiles and machinery. Emerging industries include shipbuilding and logistics (transport).

Seven major local shipyards, including one of China's largest private shipyards New Century Shipyard and its subsidiary New Time Shipyard; New Yangtze Shipyard, which went public in Singapore in 2007 and it was the first ever China's private shipyard listed on overseas stock exchange.

Administrative divisions
Jingjiang city consists of 1 subdistrict and 8 towns:
1 subdistrict
 Jingcheng - is upgraded from town.

8 towns

-Former town is merged to other.
 Binjiang

In addition the city has a provincial level economic development zone (Jingjiang Economic Development Zone).

School and Education
Middle School:
 Jiangsu Jingjiang Senior Middle School
 Jiangsu Jingjiang Xieqiao Middle School
 Jiangjiang No.1 Middle School
 Jingjiang Bingjiang School
 Jingjiang Foreign Language School

Food
The city is noted for its pork jerky and slices, along with steamed soup dumplings filled with crab juices.

Notable people
Gao Jin
Henry Liu
Tao Siju  
Song Zude
Younan Xia

References

External links
中国靖江网 

Cities in Jiangsu
Taizhou, Jiangsu